The 1966 United Kingdom general election was held on Thursday 31 March 1966. The result was a landslide victory for the Labour Party led by incumbent Prime Minister Harold Wilson.

Wilson decided to call a snap election since his government, elected a mere 17 months previously, in 1964, had an unworkably small majority of only four MPs. The Labour government was returned following this snap election with a much larger majority of 98 seats. This was the last general election in which the voting age was 21; Wilson's government passed an amendment to the Representation of the People Act in 1969 to include eligibility to vote at age 18, which was in place for the next general election in 1970.

Background
Prior to the 1966 general election, Labour had performed poorly in local elections in 1965, and lost a by-election, cutting their majority to just two. Shortly after the local elections, the leader of the Conservative Party Alec Douglas-Home was replaced by Edward Heath in the 1965 leadership election. 

Despite setbacks and a small majority, Labour believed it had an advantage due to the disorientation from the change of leadership at the Conservative Party, the improvement of economic conditions under its brief government, and a victory at the 1966 Kingston upon Hull North by-election. The Conservatives had not had much time to prepare their campaign, although it was more professional than previously. There had been little time for Heath to become well known among the British public, having led the party for just eight months before the election. For the Liberal Party, money was an issue: two elections in the space of just two years had left the party in a tight financial position and had to field less candidates. Labour ran its campaign with the slogan "You know Labour government works" and avoided commenting on controversial issues such as European integration, trade unions, and nationalization. 

The election night was broadcast live on the BBC, was presented by Cliff Michelmore, Ian Trethowan, Robin Day, Robert McKenzie and David Butler. The election was replayed on the BBC Parliament channel on the 40th anniversary of the event, and again in 2016 to mark the 50th anniversary of the election.

Although the BBC's telecast was in black and white, a couple of colour television cameras were placed in the BBC election studio at Television Centre to allow CBS's Charles Collingwood and NBC's David Brinkley to file live reports from that studio by satellite and in colour for their respective networks' evening news programmes (which were transmitted at 11:30 pm British time, 6:30 pm Eastern Standard Time).

Timeline
The Prime Minister, Harold Wilson, announced on 28 February that Parliament would be dissolved on 10 March, for an election to be held on 31 March. The key dates were as follows:

Opinion polling

 Research Services: 3% swing to Labour (forecast majority of 101)
 National opinion polls: 3.5% swing to Labour (forecast majority of 115)
 Gallup: 4.5% swing to Labour (forecast majority of 150)
 Express (known as Harris): 7.5% swing to Labour (forecast majority of in excess of 255)

Results
The Labour Party performed very well in the election and expanded its previously slim majority against the Conservative opposition to 97 seats, accomplishing a net gain of 48 seats. It won 364 seats from 48 percent of the vote, against 253 seats from 41.4 percent for the Conservatives and 12 seats from 8 percent for the Liberals. A major reason for the Labour victory was the revitalization of the party's working-class support in the 1960s. It captured its highest support yet from manual laborers at 69 percent, as well as its best performance for non-manual laborers since 1945. The government also appealed to both the right wing of the party with its cabinet dominated by junior ministers of the Attlee ministry as well as the left wing by the presence of officials such as Prime Minister Wilson, Richard Crossman, Barbara Castle, and Frank Cousins.

|-
|+ style="caption-side: bottom; font-weight:normal" |All parties shown.
|}

Votes summary

Seats summary

Incumbents defeated

Conservative

Priscilla Buchan, Lady Tweedsmuir (Aberdeen South)
Forbes Hendry (West Aberdeenshire)
Geoffrey Howe (Bebington)
Norman Cole (South Bedfordshire)
Sir William Anstruther-Gray, 1st Baronet (Berwick and East Lothian), Chairman of the 1922 Committee
Edward Gardner (Billericay)
Wyndham Davies (Birmingham Perry Barr)
Arthur Tiley (Bradford West)
Dudley Smith (Brentford and Chiswick)
Alan Hopkins (Bristol North East)
Martin McLaren (Bristol North West)
Donald Box (Cardiff North)
William Shepard (Cheadle)
Dame Patricia Hornsby-Smith (Chislehurst)
Peter Thomas (Conwy)
James Scott-Hopkins (North Cornwall)
Sir Richard Thompson, 1st Baronet (Croydon South)
Sir Anthony Meyer (Eton and Slough)
Sir Rolf Dudley-Williams, 1st Baronet (Exeter)
Henry Brooke (Hampstead), former Secretary of State for the Home Department
Anthony Courtney (Harrow East)
David Walder (High Peak)
Godfrey Lagden (Hornchurch)
Albert Cooper (Ilford South)
Humphry Berkeley (Lancaster)
Christopher Chataway (Lewisham North)
Patrick McNair-Wilson (Lewisham West)
Sir John Barlow, 2nd Baronet (Middleton and Prestwich)
Peter Thorneycroft (Monmouth), former Chancellor
William Clark (Nottingham South)
Montague Woodhouse (Oxford)
Ian Montagu Fraser (Plymouth Sutton)
Terence Clarke (Portsmouth West)
Julian Amery (Preston North), former Secretary of State for Air
Peter Emery (Reading)
Roy Wise (Rugby)
Sir Martin Redmayne, 1st Baronet (Rushcliffe)
Peter Griffiths (Smethwick)
Sir John Fletcher-Cooke (Southampton Test)
Sir Samuel Storey, 1st Baronet (Stretford), Chairman of Ways and Means
William Yates (The Wrekin)
Charles Curran (Uxbridge)
John Harvey (Walthamstow East)
Anthony Fell (Great Yarmouth)
Charles Longbottom (City of York)

Labour

Patrick Duffy (Colne Valley)

Liberal

Roderic Bowen (Ceredigion)
George Mackie (Caithness and Sutherland)

Televised declarations 
These declarations were covered live by the BBC where the returning officer was heard to say "duly elected".

 The 5,117 votes polled for the "Others" in Nelson and Colne were all polled for Patrick Downey, uncle of Lesley Ann Downey, who had been murdered by the Moors Murderers. Downey advocated the return of hanging.

See also
List of MPs elected in the 1966 United Kingdom general election
1966 United Kingdom general election in Northern Ireland

Notes

References

Further reading

External links
United Kingdom election results—summary results 1885–1979

Manifestos
Action Not Words: The New Conservative Programme, 1966 Conservative Party manifesto
Time for Decision, 1966 Labour Party manifesto
For All the People: the Liberal Plan of 1966, 1966 Liberal Party manifesto

 
1966
General election
Harold Wilson
Edward Heath